CHYM may refer to:

 CHYM-FM, a radio station in Ontario, Canada
 CHyM - Cetemps Hydrological Model, for modelling drainage, floods etc.
 Chym, part of Perín-Chym, a municipality in Slovakia